The Sea Dragon was a 1962 conceptualized design study for a two-stage sea-launched orbital super heavy-lift launch vehicle. The project was led by Robert Truax while working at Aerojet, one of a number of designs he created that were to be launched by floating the rocket in the ocean. Although there was some interest at both NASA and Todd Shipyards, the project was not implemented.

, among rockets that have been fully conceived but not built, it is by far the largest ever and, in terms of payload into low Earth orbit (LEO), equaled only by the Interplanetary Transport System concept (the predecessor to SpaceX Starship) in the latter's expendable configuration with both designed for 550 tonnes.

Design
Truax's basic idea was to produce a low-cost heavy launcher, a concept now called "big dumb booster." To lower the cost of operation, the rocket itself was launched from the ocean, requiring little in the way of support systems. A large ballast tank system attached to the bottom of the first-stage engine bell was used to "hoist" the rocket vertical for launch. In this orientation the payload at the top of the second stage was just above the waterline, making it easy to access. Truax had already experimented with this basic system in the Sea Bee and Sea Horse. To lower the cost of the rocket, he intended it to be built of inexpensive materials, specifically 8 mm steel sheeting. The rocket would be built at a sea-side shipbuilder and towed to sea for launch. It would use wide engineering margins with strong simple materials to further enhance reliability and reduce cost and complexity. The system would be at least partially reusable with passive reentry and recovery of rocket sections for refurbishment and relaunch.

The first stage was to be powered by a single  thrust engine burning RP-1 and LOX (liquid oxygen). As the vehicle climbed the pressures dropped off, eventually burning out after 81 seconds. The normal mission profile expended the stage in a high-speed splashdown some  downrange. Plans for stage recovery were studied as well.

The second stage was also equipped with a single very large engine, in this case a  thrust engine burning liquid hydrogen and LOX. It was also pressure-fed, at a constant lower pressure of  throughout the entire 260 second burn, at which point it was  up and  downrange. To improve performance, the engine featured an expanding engine bell, changing from 7:1 to 27:1 expansion as it climbed. The overall height of the rocket was shortened somewhat by making the "nose" of the first stage pointed, lying inside the second-stage engine bell.

A typical launch sequence would start with the rocket being refurbished and mated to its cargo and ballast tanks on shore. The RP-1 would also be loaded at this point. The rocket would then be towed to a launch site, where the LOX and LH2 would be generated on-site using electrolysis; Truax suggested using a nuclear-powered aircraft carrier as a power supply during this phase. The ballast tanks, which also served as a cap and protection for the first-stage engine bell, would then be filled with water, sinking the rocket to vertical with the second stage above the waterline. Last minute checks could then be carried out and the rocket launched.

Payload costs, in 1963, were estimated to be between $59 to $600 per kg (roughly $500 to $5,060 per kg in 2020 dollars). TRW (Space Technology Laboratories, Inc.) conducted a program review and validated the design and its expected costs. However, budget pressures led to the closing of the Future Projects Branch, ending work on the super-heavy launchers they had proposed for a crewed mission to Mars.

Sea Dragon in fiction 
The Sea Dragon appears in the first-season finale of the 2019 Apple TV+ series For All Mankind. The series is set in an alternate history timeline in which the 1960s-era space race did not end. In the post-credits scene, which takes place in 1983, a Sea Dragon is depicted launching from the Pacific Ocean to resupply the US lunar colony. An astronaut says in a voice-over that the ocean launch is being used as a safety measure because the payload includes plutonium. The Sea Dragon continues to play a role in season 2; its high payload capacity is used to resupply an expansive lunar base and is the subject of a lunar blockade by the Soviet Union.

See also  

 Aquarius (rocket)

Notes

References

Further reading
Astronautix.com, Sea Dragon

External links

 Truax Engineering Multimedia Archive
 Sea Dragon Concept Volume 1 (Summary), LRP 297 (NASA-CR-52817), 1963-01-28.
 Sea Dragon Concept Volume 3 (Preliminary program plan), LRP 297 (NASA-CR-51034), 1963-02-12.
 YouTube Channel Link: 
 Encyclopedia Astronautica, Sea Dragon
 Big Dumb Rockets
 YouTube, Sea Dragon - 8.14 TMRO - Interview show about "Sea Dragon"
 Search "Sea Dragon Concept" at the NASA Technical Report Server to read the unclassified design study:
 Sea Dragon Concept Volume 1 (Summary), LRP 297 (NASA-CR-52817), 1963-01-28.
 Sea Dragon Concept Volume 3 (Preliminary program plan), LRP 297 (NASA-CR-51034), 1963-02-12.

NASA space launch vehicles
Hypothetical spacecraft
Pressure-fed rockets
Sea launch to orbit
Cancelled space launch vehicles
Proposed reusable launch systems